Cesare Toffolo is a glass artist who lives in Murano, Italy, and works from his glass studio from a 14th century palace there. He is considered to be the world's best technical flame worker.

He was born in Murano in 1961 and grew up in a family of glass artists. His grandfather Giacomo was a master glassmaker in the Venini Furnace company, as was his father, Florino. Cesare often visited his father's workshop and mastered flamework from the age of 15.

Toffolo invented new techniques, such as watermark or the use of gold leaf. He has collaborated with the most prestigious glass establishments in Murano and abroad and has educated many other professional glass artists.

At only 21, he was already exhibiting at Ca 'Vendramin in Venice. At 30, Toffolo was invited to teach in Seattle at the Pilchuck Glass School. He was then asked to teach classes at: the Niijima Glass Art Center in Tokyo, at The Studio of Corning Museum of Glass, at the Penland School of Crafts in North Carolina, at the Toyama Glass Art Institute and at Kanazu Forest of Creation Foundation in Japan.

He is the founder of Centro Studio Vetro, an association started in Murano in 1997, aimed at promoting exchanges around glass, in Italy and abroad. He was also the designer of Vetro Magazine.

References 

Italian glass artists
Artists from the Metropolitan City of Venice
1961 births
Living people
People from Murano